
A portrait is a visual likeness of a person.

Portrait or portraits may also refer to:
 Portrait painting
 Portrait photography
 Portrait (literature), a written description or analysis of a person or thing 
 Portrait, a page orientation, as opposed to landscape

Music
 Portrait Records, a record company
 Portrait (group), an R&B quartet

Albums
 Portrait (The Walker Brothers album), 1966
 Portrait (Glen Campbell album), 1968
 Portrait (The 5th Dimension album), 1970
 Portrait (Nora Aunor album), 1971
 Portrait (Lynda Carter album), 1978
 Portrait (The Nolans album), 1982
 Portrait (Doc Watson album), 1987
 Portrait (Lee Ritenour album), 1987
 Portrait (Portrait album), a 1992 self-titled album by Portrait
 Portrait (Rick Astley album), 2005
 Portraits (Gerald Wilson album), 1964
 Portraits (Graham Collier album), 1973
 Portraits (Side Effect album), 1981
 Portraits (Tri Yann album), 1995
 Portraits (So Long Ago, So Clear), 1996 compilation album by Vangelis
 Portraits (Bury Tomorrow album), 2009
 Portraits (For Today album), 2009
 Portraits (Max Raptor album), 2011
 Portraits (Greyson Chance album), 2019
 A Portrait (Voice of the Beehive album)
 A Portrait (John Denver album), 1999
 Portrait, a 1992 album by British entertainer Des O'Connor
 Portrait, a 1971 album by Cleo Laine
 Portrait, a 2018 mini-album by Peakboy

Songs
 "Portrait (He Knew)", a song by Kansas, 1977
 "Portrait", a song by Die Monster from Withdrawal Method, 1994
 "Portrait", a song by P.O.D. from Satellite, 2001
 "Portrait", a single by Duke Special from Songs from the Deep Forest, 2006
 "Portrait", a song by Take That from III, 2014 
 "Portrait", a song by Mariah Carey from Caution, 2018

Other uses
 Portrait (TV series) (1965), Canadian

See also
 The Portrait (disambiguation)
 Self-portrait, in which an artist portrays their own image
 American portrait (disambiguation)